Jeffrey Alleyne (born 25 June 1938) is a Canadian boxer. He competed in the men's light middleweight event at the 1960 Summer Olympics, losing his opening bout to Celedonio Lima of Argentina after receiving a first-round bye. Alleyne was born in St. Philip, Barbados and emigrated to Canada in 1955.  He lived in Montreal.

References

1938 births
Living people
Light-middleweight boxers
Canadian male boxers
Olympic boxers of Canada
Boxers at the 1960 Summer Olympics
People from Saint Philip, Barbados
Boxers from Montreal
Barbadian emigrants to Canada
Anglophone Quebec people
Black Canadian boxers